Lu Wang may refer to: 
Philosophies of Lu Jiuyuan (1139–1192) and Wang Yangming (1472–1529)
Jiang Ziya (fl. 11th century BC), also known as Lü Wang

See also
 Luwang, a clan of Meetei in India
 Prince of Lu (disambiguation) or Lu Wang
 Wang Lu (disambiguation) for a list of people with the surname Wang